Abul Kalam Azad is a Bangladeshi businessman, former freedom fighter in the Liberation War of Bangladesh, Bangladesh Awami League politician and the former Member of Parliament of Rangpur-6.

Career
Azad was elected to parliament from Rangpur-6 as a Bangladesh Awami League candidate in an April 2009 by-election. Prime Minister Sheikh Hasina was elected from here and two other constituency, she choose to represent Gopalganj-3 which triggered by-elections in Rangpur-6 and Bagerhat-1.

References

Awami League politicians
Living people
9th Jatiya Sangsad members
1950 births